Pachyplectrus is a genus of thick scavenger scarab beetles in the family Hybosoridae containing one described species, P. laevis.

References

Further reading

 
 

Scarabaeoidea genera
Monotypic Scarabaeiformia genera
Articles created by Qbugbot